Statistics of FAM Youth Championship in the 2011 season.

In 2011, The Championship was named as Maldivian FA Youth Cup, for the under-20 players.

Overview
Maziya Sports & Recreation Club won the championship by beating New Radiant SC by 1-0 in the final. Mohamed Shah scored the only goal for them in the first half.

Teams
7 teams participated in the competition, and they were divided into two groups. 4 teams for Group A and 3 teams to Group B.

Group A
 New Radiant Sports Club
 Club Eagles
 Club All Youth Linkage
 Victory Sports Club

Group B
 Club Valencia
 VB Sports Club
 Maziya Sports & Recreation Club

Group stage

Group A

Group B

Play-offs

Page play-offs

Semi-final

Final

Awards
All the awards were given by the Maldivian Football legend Moosa Manik.

Best three players
 Ali Haisham (New Radiant SC)
 Abdul Wahid Mohamed (Club Valencia)
 Mohamed Thasmeen (Maziya S&RC)

Top goal scorer
 Ali Haisham (New Radiant SC)
 Abdul Basith (New Radiant SC)

Best goal keeper
 Ismail Fathih (Maziya S&RC)

Best coach
 Mohamed Suwaid (Maziya S&RC)

Fair play team
 Maziya S&RC

References

FAM Youth Championship
4